Ahmet Benler was the son of Özdemir Benler, the Turkish ambassador to the Netherlands. He was assassinated on October 12, 1979, in The Hague. The responsibility for his assassination was claimed separately by ASALA and JCAG.

Twenty-seven-year-old Ahmet Benler, the only son of the Turkish ambassador to the Netherlands, was a post-graduate student at Delft University. According to the police, on the way to the university, he stopped his Volkswagen for a traffic light when a gunman, who had been standing at a trolley stop, walked up and fired between four and six shots through the vehicle's closed window. Benler died on the spot.

Capture and trial of the alleged assassin 

His alleged assassin Mustafa Hassan Ammar, as his Lebanese passport stated, was returned to the Netherlands for the trial. However, he was discharged on grounds of insufficient evidence after a seven-hour hearing.

See also
List of Turkish diplomats assassinated by Armenian militant organisations

References 

1979 deaths
Turkish people murdered abroad
Year of birth missing
Netherlands–Turkey relations
1979 in the Netherlands
Terrorist attacks attributed to Armenian militant groups
Terrorism in the Netherlands